Oregon Route 216 is an Oregon state highway running from U.S. Route 26 at Warm Springs Junction to U.S. Route 97 in Grass Valley.

Route description 

OR 216 begins at an intersection with US 26 at Warm Springs Junction on the Warm Springs Indian Reservation.  It heads east along the border between the reservation and Mt. Hood National Forest, then continues through Pine Grove, and past Wapinitia to an intersection with U.S. Route 197 about two miles (3 km) west of Maupin.  At this intersection, OR 216 overlaps U.S. 197 and continues north to Tygh Valley.  The concurrency ends at Tygh Valley, and OR 216 continues east to Grass Valley, ending at an intersection with US 97.

Highways comprising 

OR 216 comprises the following named highways (see Oregon highways and routes):

 The Wapinitia Highway No. 44;
 Part of The Dalles-California Highway No. 4; and
 The Sherars Bridge Highway No. 290.

History 

The Wapinitia Highway was originally designated part of OR 50.  In 1950, it was redesignated OR 52, as the OR 50 designation was moved to the Warm Springs Highway No. 53, and is now part of US 26.  In 1952, when the former OR 90 was renumbered OR 52 to conform to its intersection with ID 52, the Wapinitia Highway was renumbered as part of OR 216.

The Sherars Bridge Highway can be traced to a bridge over the Deschutes River, built in 1860 and rebuilt in 1862. Joseph Sherar and his wife, Jane, bought the log bridge in 1871, replaced it with a wooden toll bridge, and improved  of an existing wagon road that crossed the bridge. The bridge was purchased by Deschutes County in 1912, the modern highway built some time thereafter.

Major intersections

References

 Oregon Department of Transportation, Descriptions of US and Oregon Routes, https://web.archive.org/web/20051102084300/http://www.oregon.gov/ODOT/HWY/TRAFFIC/TEOS_Publications/PDF/Descriptions_of_US_and_Oregon_Routes.pdf, pages 2, 20.
 Oregon Department of Transportation, Wapinitia Highway No. 44, ftp://ftp.odot.state.or.us/tdb/trandata/maps/slchart_pdfs_1980_to_2002/Hwy044_1997.pdf
 Oregon Department of Transportation, The Dalles-California Highway No. 4, ftp://ftp.odot.state.or.us/tdb/trandata/maps/slchart_pdfs_1980_to_2002/Hwy004_1999.pdf
 Oregon Department of Transportation, Sherars Bridge Highway No. 290, ftp://ftp.odot.state.or.us/tdb/trandata/maps/slchart_pdfs_1980_to_2002/Hwy290_1997.pdf
 Oregon History Project, Sherar's Hotel & Toll Bridge,  http://www.ohs.org/education/oregonhistory/historical_records/dspDocument.cfm?doc_ID=8A131DA8-92FB-C912-7A9F8C3B09FBF50D
 ORoads: Oregon Route 52, http://www.angelfire.com/or3/oroads/roads/or52/

216
Transportation in Wasco County, Oregon
Transportation in Sherman County, Oregon